The 1981–82 Illinois Fighting Illini men's basketball team represented the University of Illinois.

Regular season
The 1982 season brought Illinois another post-season appearance, in the NIT, and an 18-11 record. Derek Harper
led the Big Ten in assists and steals.

Roster

Source

Schedule
												
Source																
												

|-
!colspan=12 style="background:#DF4E38; color:white;"| Non-Conference regular season
				
	

|-
!colspan=9 style="background:#DF4E38; color:#FFFFFF;"|Big Ten regular season	

|-
!colspan=9 style="text-align: center; background:#DF4E38"|National Invitation Tournament

|-

Player stats

Awards and honors
 Derek Harper
Fighting Illini All-Century team (2005)
James Griffin & Perry Range
Team Co-Most Valuable Players

Team players drafted into the NBA

Rankings

References

Illinois
Illinois Fighting Illini men's basketball seasons
Illinois
Illinois Fight
Illinois Fight